Natasha Williams (born Roselyn Agatha Williams; 18 July 1971) is a British-based Jamaican actress.

Williams is known for playing the role of PC Delia French in the long running ITV drama The Bill. She also played the role of a pharmacist in "Gridlock", an episode of Doctor Who that was broadcast on 14 April 2007, and appeared in Powers in 2004. Her film roles include City Rats (2009) and Silent Cry (2002). She starred in Out of Order (1987), as well as television movies such as Esther where she had the role of Maimuna, the faithful servant of Queen Esther who Louise Lombard played. Other film roles include The Murder of Stephen Lawrence (1999) and the political satire Giving Tongue (1996). She also played Mara in the 2002 documentary Ice World.

References

External links
 

Living people
British television actresses
1971 births
British film actresses
Jamaican emigrants to the United Kingdom
People from Trelawny Parish
Jamaican film actresses
Jamaican television actresses
20th-century Jamaican actresses
21st-century Jamaican actresses